This is a list of Greek composers.

Greek
 
Composers